The Army of Alsace was a French field army of the First World War that operated from 11 to 28 August 1914.

Formation 

On 7 August 1914, the French VII Corps (General Bonneau) captured Mulhouse but were forced out three days later by German counter-attacks. Bonneau was dismissed by Joffre and the VII Corps was expanded, becoming the  under command of Paul Pau.

The reinforcements were 
 44th Division 
 55th Reserve Division 
 58th Reserve division
 63rd Reserve division
 66th Reserve division
 8th Cavalry Division

A new attack was launched, Mulhouse was taken and the Germans were even pushed over the Rhine.

Disbandment 
The army was disbanded on 28 August and many of its units distributed among the remaining French armies. On 8 December 1914, with the stabilisation of the Western Front, more units were added to this sector and they formed the independent  under General Henri Putz. On 4 April 1915, the force became the Seventh Army.

Footnotes

References 

 
 

1914 in France
France in World War I
World War I orders of battle
Military units and formations of France in World War I
Military history of France